Katya Adaui (born 14 February 1977) is a Peruvian writer. She was born in Lima, lived in Pueblo Libre and studied journalism at Bausate y Mesa and then creative writing at the Universidad Nacional de Tres de Febrero in Buenos Aires.

She is the author of several books, among them the short story collections Geografía de la oscuridad, Aquí hay icebergs and Algo se nos ha escapado. She has also written 2 novels: Quiénes somos ahora and Nunca sabré lo que entiendo; also the children's books, Todo puede ser otra cosa, Patichueca y Muy Muy en Bora Bora. 

Adaui's story collection Aquí hay icebergs has been translated by Rosalind Harvey for Charco Press. 

She lives in Buenos Aires and dictates writing workshops.

References

Peruvian women writers
1977 births
Living people